Cremyll (pronounced ) is a small coastal village in south-east Cornwall, England, United Kingdom. Cremyll is on the Rame Peninsula facing Plymouth Sound. The village is about 9 miles by road or 0.5 miles by boat from Plymouth. It is in the civil parish of Maker-with-Rame.

History
There has been a ferry at Cremyll since the 11th century and it was a link in the main southern route into Cornwall until the 1830s.  In medieval times the ferry was part of the manor of Stone-House, held by the Valletorts. There was a larger community called West Stonehouse (compare with East Stonehouse) until it was burnt by the French  in 1350.

The Cornish side of Plymouth Sound was not always Cornish. It was incorporated into Anglo-Saxon territory in 705 CE in order to secure both banks of the estuary against Viking raids. An area of the Rame Peninsula, (up to Kingsand) remained as part of Devon until 1844, when it was made part of Cornwall. The village is on the most easterly extension of the Rame Peninsula, known as the "Forgotten Corner."

Culture and community
Today the Cremyll Ferry carries foot passengers and cyclists from Cremyll to Plymouth. Cremyll is on the South West Coast Path which is the longest of the waymarked long-distance footpaths in England.
 
Cremyll Road in Torpoint is named after the Cremyll settlement.

The Edgcumbe Arms, an inn which dates back to the 17th century, was destroyed by fire and rebuilt in 1995.

Cremyll's former schoolroom and chapel was built at the expense of the William Edgcumbe in 1867. It is now a private residence, the Old School Rooms.

Landmarks
The main entrance to Mount Edgcumbe House is in Cremyll.  Mount Edgcumbe House is a stately home and a Grade II listed building, whilst the gardens are listed as Grade I in the Register of Parks and Gardens of Special Historic Interest in England. Cremyll has a pay and display car park operated by Cornwall Council with about 50 spaces, mainly there for visitors to Mount Edgcumbe Country Park.

References

External links

Villages in Cornwall
Populated coastal places in Cornwall